In the Chicago mayoral election of 1895, was held on tuesday April 2 Republican candidate George Bell Swift was elected, winning a majority of the vote and defeating Democratic nominee Frank Wenter by more than a twenty point margin.

Incumbent mayor Hopkins did not seek reelection. In addition to Wenter (who was the president of the Sanitary District of Chicago), Chicago Postmaster Washington Hesing also initially sought the nomination of the Democratic Party. However, by the time of the party's nominating convention, Wenter had secured enough support to drive Hesing out of the race.

Background
Nationally, amid the Panic of 1893, the Democratic Party had experienced a national decline in support and Republicans a national rise in support. In the 1894 United States elections, Republicans took control of both chambers of US congress from the Democrats. In the United States House of Representatives election, Republicans won what is the largest-ever seat gain in the chamber's history. In Illinois, Republicans won increased majorities in the Illinois General Assembly, and increased their share of Illinois' then-22 US congressional seats from 11 to 20. In the Cook County elections, Republicans won all countywide offices.

In Chicago, the local decline in Democratic support was attributable to both local matters and the overall national decline in support of Democrats. Local matters that contributed to this decline in support included fallout of the Ogden Gas Scandal and an especially strong disapproval in Chicago of Democratic President Grover Cleveland's intervention in the Pullman Strike and the economic fallout of the Panic of 1893.

Incumbent Democratic mayor John Patrick Hopkins's tenure had been marred by numerous scandals, criticisms, and shortcomings. This included incidents political corruption in the city such as the Ogden Gas Scandal, rampant public gambling that drew the ire of the Chicago Civic Federation, an indecisive response by Hopkins to the Pullman Strike that was assailed by Republican press outlets. Additionally, the misappropriation of significant amounts of campaign contributions by Hopkins had upset many in the Chicago Democratic party, including those who belonged to the party's former Harrison faction.

Nominations

Democratic nomination
While Democratic incumbent John Patrick Hopkins had initially voiced his intent to resign at the end of his term, amid the fallout of the Ogden gas scandal he began considering reversing this decision, in hopes that he might be able to redeem himself before the voters. However, prospects of him seeking reelection were quickly squashed.

The only two individuals ultimately interested in the nomination were Chicago Postmaster Washington Hesing and President of the Sanitary District of Chicago Frank Wenter.

In his pursuit of the nomination, Wenter received support from the wing of the party that had in the past backed Carter Harrison Sr.

By the time of the convention, well nothing was certain, the race for the nomination appeared to be in Wenter's favor. At the convention, Wenter was easily chosen by acclamation, with Hesing withdrawing before the nomination process even finished.

Republican nomination
The Republican nomination went to George Bell Swift. Swift had previously served as acting mayor of Chicago in 1893, following the assassination of Carter Harrison Sr. This brief tenure had been controversial.

People's (Populist) nomination
The People's (Populist) party nominated Bayard Taylor Holmes, an advocate for improved medical education and public health.

General election

Wenter worked hard to campaign against Swift. During the campaign, speeches held by Democratic candidate Wenter attracted large and enthusiastic crowds. Substantial funds were raised for his campaign and a large campaign committee was formed to support its operations.

Wenter sought to present himself as an individual who was not a "machine politician", and was not intending to run on Hopkins' record. He argued the central concern of the election should be "competence". He contrasted his well-regarded record as head of the Sanitary District with what had been a controversial brief tenure of Swift as interim mayor.

Results

Swift received 37.11% of the Polish-American vote, while Wenter received 57.96%.

References

Works cited

Mayoral elections in Chicago
Chicago
Chicago
1890s in Chicago